Gurumin: A Monstrous Adventure is a 2004 action role-playing game developed by Nihon Falcom. It was originally released in Japan in December 2004 for Windows. A PlayStation Portable version was later released in Japan in June 2006, in North America by Mastiff in February 2007, and in Europe by 505 Game Street in March 2007. A Nintendo 3DS version, titled Gurumin 3D, was released in 2016.

Gameplay
Gurumin is a 3D action RPG with heavy emphasis on action through real-time combat. Parin can acquire various headwear which have varying effects while equipped, such as protection from water damage, stronger attacks, or HP restoration. Each piece of headwear can be upgraded to increase their effects. Parin's drill has up to four power levels that are increased through combat or restoration points in levels and decreased by taking damage. The current level of her drill dictates damage that can be dealt and can change up and down frequently in each level. Various consumable items can be bought or found which are used during levels to restore HP or drill power.

Gurumin offers replayability by offering new difficulty levels upon completion of the game. The game starts with Beginner and Normal modes; Hard, Happy, and Crazy modes are opened up with completion of the previous difficulty level. While each difficulty alters the strength of the enemies, some also change other elements of the game, such as removing environmental hazards in Beginner mode, an altered game script in Happy mode (Japanese version only), and only allowing damaging of enemies through critical hits in Crazy mode.

In addition to headwear that gives characters various abilities and protection there is also a number of outfits that can be equipped. Matching the right outfit with the right hat could unlock additional abilities. These are acquired by purchasing from the (vending machine), completing the game at a set difficulty level, or through other means, such as playing on the right date when a special event happens.

Plot
A girl named Parin goes to live with her grandfather in Tiese Town after her parents are called overseas on an excavation trip. After being told that there are no other children in Tiese, she finds what looks like another girl who is being threatened by a dog. To thank Parin, the monster takes her to a crack in the back wall of the town which is revealed to be a portal to the monster world. A group of monsters known as phantoms begin a series of attacks on Monster Village. Parin, who unearths a legendary drill, decides to fight against the phantoms and restore Monster Village.

Reception

The game received "generally favorable reviews" according to the review aggregation website Metacritic.  In Japan, Famitsu gave the PSP version a total of 31 out of 40. Subsequent reviews for the 3DS port have been "mixed or average."

Notes

References

Further reading

External links
 
Gurumin 3D official site

2004 video games
Action role-playing video games
Nihon Falcom games
Nintendo 3DS eShop games
PlayStation Portable games
Video games featuring female protagonists
Windows games
Single-player video games
Sega video games
Video games with cel-shaded animation
Video games developed in Japan
Mastiff (company) games
505 Games games
Flyhigh Works games